Charles Eastlake Smith (1850 – 10 January 1917) was an English amateur footballer who played for Crystal Palace and England. By profession, he was an insurance clerk.

Early life
Smith was born in Colombo, Ceylon in 1850. He is the son of James and Matilda Smith. His father James had been born in Scotland and was an East Indian Merchant. He was educated at Rossall School in Lancashire and played in the school football XI in 1869 and 1870 being captain in his final year.

Football
Smith played for Crystal Palace and later Wanderers as a forward; in 1876 he won an international cap when he played for England against Scotland.

Smith served on the Football Association committee between 1875 and 1876.

Family
Smith was the cousin of fellow England international, Gilbert Smith.

Smith married Lizzie Cooper in Lewisham in 1880. They had a son Claude Eastlake Smith and a daughter Gladys Shirley Eastlake Smith who became a tennis player and was an Olympic gold medalist in 1908.
 
Smith died in Bromley, London on 10 January 1917.

See also
 List of England international footballers born outside England

References

1850 births
1917 deaths
English footballers
England international footballers
Association football forwards
Crystal Palace F.C. (1861) players
Wanderers F.C. players
People educated at Rossall School
English people of Scottish descent
Sportspeople from Colombo
People from British Ceylon